Hoppy Mehterian is an American sound engineer. He was nominated for ten Primetime Emmy Awards in the category Outstanding Sound Mixing.

Filmography 
 The Evictors (1979)
 Up from the Depths (1979)
 Swap Meet (1979)
 The Jerk (1979)
 Losin' It (1982)
 Wavelength (1983)
 Dreamscape (1984)
 Body Rock (1984)
 Girls Just Want to Have Fun (1985)
 Medium Rare (1988)

References

External links 

Possibly living people
Place of birth missing (living people)
Year of birth missing (living people)
American audio engineers
20th-century American engineers